Babagouda Patil (6 January 1945 – 21 May 2021) was an union minister of the state of India. He was Minister of Rural Areas & Employment in the Second Vajpayee Ministry.

Patil was elected to the Lok Sabha from Belagavi in Karnataka on the Bharatiya Janata Party ticket. Before joining BJP he was founder and chairperson of “Karnataka Rajya Raityasangha” through which he worked for the welfare of Indian farmers. He was active in the farmers' movement in Karnataka.

Patil died in 2021 from COVID-19.

References

External links 

People from Belgaum
1945 births
2021 deaths
Place of birth missing
Bharatiya Janata Party politicians from Karnataka
Lok Sabha members from Karnataka
Union ministers of state of India
India MPs 1998–1999
Janata Dal (Secular) politicians
Karnataka MLAs 1989–1994
Deaths from the COVID-19 pandemic in India